The Burmese alphabet ( mranma akkha.ra) is an abugida used for writing Burmese. It is ultimately adapted from a Brahmic script, either the Kadamba or Pallava alphabet of South India. The Burmese alphabet is also used for the liturgical languages of Pali and Sanskrit. In recent decades, other, related alphabets, such as Shan and modern Mon, have been restructured according to the standard of the Burmese alphabet (see Mon–Burmese script.)

Burmese is written from left to right and requires no spaces between words, although modern writing usually contains spaces after each clause to enhance readability and to avoid grammar ambiguity. There are several systems of transliteration into the Latin alphabet; for this article, the MLC Transcription System is used.

Alphabet

History

The Burmese alphabet was derived from the Pyu script, the Old Mon script, or directly from a South Indian script, either the Kadamba or Pallava alphabet. The earliest evidence of the Burmese alphabet is dated to 1035, while a casting made in the 18th century of an old stone inscription points to 984. Burmese calligraphy originally followed a square format but the cursive format took hold from the 17th century when popular writing led to the wider use of palm leaves and folded paper known as parabaiks. A stylus would rip these leaves when making straight lines. The alphabet has undergone considerable modification to suit the evolving phonology of the Burmese language.

Arrangement
As with other Brahmic scripts, the Burmese alphabet is arranged into groups of five letters for stop consonants called wek (ဝဂ်, from Pali ) based on articulation. Within each group, the first letter is tenuis ("plain"), the second is the aspirated homologue, the third and fourth are the voiced homologues and the fifth is the nasal homologue. This is true of the first twenty-five letters in the Burmese alphabet, which are called grouped together as wek byi (ဝဂ်ဗျည်း, from Pali ). The remaining eight letters are grouped together as a wek (အဝဂ်), as they are not arranged in any particular pattern.

Letters
A letter is a consonant or consonant cluster that occurs before the vowel of a syllable. The Burmese alphabet has 33 letters to indicate the initial consonant of a syllable and four diacritics to indicate additional consonants in the onset. Like other abugidas, including the other members of the Brahmic family, vowels are indicated in Burmese alphabet by diacritics, which are placed above, below, before or after the consonant character. A consonant character with no vowel diacritic has the inherent vowel  (often reduced to  when another syllable follows in the same word).

The following table provides the letter, the syllable onset in IPA and the way the letter is referred to in Burmese, which may be either a descriptive name or just the sound of the letter, arranged in the traditional order:

ဃ, ဈ, ဋ, ဌ, ဍ, ဎ, ဏ, ဓ, ဘ, and ဠ are primarily used in words of Pali origin.
ၐ and ၑ are exclusively used in Sanskrit words, as they have merged to သ in Pali.
ည has an alternate form ဉ, used with the vowel diacritic ာ as a syllable onset and alone as a final.
With regard to pronunciation, the corresponding letters of the dentals and alveolars are phonetically equivalent.
In formal speech, ရ is often pronounced  in words of Pali or foreign origin.
အ is nominally treated as a consonant in the Burmese alphabet; it represents an initial glottal stop in syllables with no other consonant.
The letter န (n) uses a different form when there is a diacritic under it like in နု (nu.)

Consonant letters may be modified by one or more medial diacritics (three at most), indicating an additional consonant before the vowel. These diacritics are:
Ya pin (ယပင့်) - Written ျ (MLCTS -y-, indicating /j/ medial or palatalization of a velar consonant)
Ya yit (ရရစ်) - Written ြ (MLCTS -r-, indicating /j/ medial or palatalization of a velar consonant)
Wa hswe (ဝဆွဲ) - Written ွ (MLCTS -w-, usually indicating /w/ medial)
Ha hto (ဟထိုး) - ှ (MLCTS h-, indicating that a sonorant consonant is voiceless)

A few Burmese dialects use an extra diacritic to indicate the /l/ medial, which has merged to /j/ in standard Burmese:
La hswe (လဆွဲ) - Written ္လ (MLCTS -l, indicating /l/ medial

All the possible diacritic combinations are listed below:

Stroke order
Letters in the Burmese alphabet are written with a specific stroke order. The letter forms of the Burmese script are based on circles. Typically, one circle should be done with one stroke, and all circles are written clockwise. Exceptions are mostly letters with an opening on top. The circle of these letters is written with two strokes coming from opposite directions.

The ten following letters are exceptions to the clockwise rule: ပ, ဖ, ဗ, မ, ယ, လ, ဟ, ဃ, ဎ, ဏ. Some versions of stroke order may be slightly different.

The Burmese stroke order can be learned from ပထမတန်း မြန်မာဖတ်စာ ၂၀၁၇-၂၀၁၈ (Burmese Grade 1, 2017-2018), a textbook published by the Burmese Ministry of Education. The book is available under the LearnBig project of UNESCO. Other resources include the Center for Southeast Asian Studies, Northern Illinois University and an online learning resource published by the Ministry of Education, Taiwan.

Syllable rhymes
Syllable rhymes (i.e. vowels and any consonants that may follow them within the same syllable) are indicated in Burmese by a combination of diacritic marks and consonant letters marked with the virama character ် which suppresses the inherent vowel of the consonant letter. This mark is called asat in Burmese, which means "nonexistence" (see Sat (Sanskrit)).

Diacritics and symbols

One or more of these accents can be added to a consonant to change its sound. In addition, other modifying symbols are used to differentiate tone and sound, but are not considered diacritics.

History
La hswe (လဆွဲ) was used in old Burmese from the Bagan to Innwa periods (12th century - 16th century), and could be combined with other diacritics (ya pin, ha hto and wa hswe) to form ္လျ ္လွ ္လှ. Similarly, until the Innwa period, ya pin was also combined with ya yit to form ျြ. From the early Bagan period to the 19th century, ဝ် was used instead of ော် for the rhyme  Early Burmese writing also used ဟ်, not the high tone marker  း, which came into being in the 16th century. Moreover, အ်, which disappeared by the 16th century, was subscripted to represent creaky tone (now indicated with  ့). During the early Bagan period, the rhyme  (now represented with the diacritic  ဲ) was represented with  ါယ်). The diacritic combination  ိုဝ် disappeared in the mid-1750s (typically designated as Middle Burmese), having been replaced with the  ို combination, introduced in 1638. The standard tone markings found in modern Burmese can be traced to the 19th century.

Stacked consonants
Certain sequences of consonants are written one atop the other, or stacked. A pair of stacked consonants indicates that no vowel is pronounced between them, as for example the m-bh in ကမ္ဘာ kambha "world". This is equivalent to using a virama ် on the first consonant (in this case, the m); if the m and bh were not stacked, the inherent vowel a would be assumed (*ကမဘာ kamabha). As Stacked consonants are always homorganic (pronounced in the same place in the mouth), which is indicated by the traditional arrangement of the Burmese alphabet into five-letter rows of letters called ဝဂ်. Consonants not found in a row beginning with k, c, t, or p can only be doubled – that is, stacked with themselves.

When stacked, the first consonant (the final of the preceding syllable, in this case m) is written as usual, while the second consonant (the onset of the following syllable, in this case bh) is subscripted beneath it.

Stacked consonants are largely confined to loan words from languages like Pali, Sanskrit, and occasionally English. For instance, the Burmese word for "self" (via Pali ) is spelt အတ္တ, not *အတ်တ, although both would be read the same. Stacked consonants are generally not found in native Burmese words, with a major exception being abbreviation. For example, the Burmese word သမီး "daughter" is sometimes abbreviated to သ္မီး, even though the stacked consonants do not belong to the same row and a vowel is pronounced between. Similarly, လက်ဖက် "tea" is commonly abbreviated to လ္ဘက်. Also, ss is written ဿ, not သ္သ.

Digits

A decimal numbering system is used, and numbers are written in the same order as Hindu–Arabic numerals.

The digits from zero to nine are: ၀၁၂၃၄၅၆၇၈၉ (Unicode 1040 to 1049). The number 1945 would be written as ၁၉၄၅. Separators, such as commas, are not used to group numbers.

Punctuation
There are two primary break characters in Burmese, drawn as one or two downward strokes: ၊ (called ပုဒ်ဖြတ်, ပုဒ်ကလေး, ပုဒ်ထီး, or တစ်ချောင်းပုဒ်) and ။ (called ပုဒ်ကြီး, ပုဒ်မ, or နှစ်ချောင်းပုဒ်), which respectively act as a comma and a full stop. There is a Shan exclamation mark ႟. Other abbreviations used in literary Burmese are:
 ၏ — used as a full stop if the sentence immediately ends with a verb.
-possessive particle( 's, of)
 ၍ — used as a conjunction.
 ၌ — locative ('at').
 ၎င်း — ditto (used in columns and lists)

Unicode

Myanmar script was added to the Unicode Standard in September 1999 with the release of version 3.0.

The Unicode block for Myanmar is U+1000–U+109F:

See also
 Romanization of Burmese
 Mon–Burmese script
 Burmese Braille
 Burmese respelling of the English alphabet

References

Bibliography
 
 
 
 
Hosken, Martin. (2012). "Representing Myanmar in Unicode: Details and Examples" (ver. 4). Unicode Technical Note 11.
 
 Sawada, Hideo. (2013). "Some Properties of Burmese Script". Presented at the 23rd Meeting of the Southeast Asian Linguistics Society (SEALS23), Chulalongkorn University, Thailand.

External links

Burmese/Myanmar script and pronunciation at Omniglot
Myanmar Unicode Character Picker
Myanmar Unicode Implementation Public Awareness
Myanmar3 keyboard layout
myWin2.2
ALA-LC romanization system for Burmese
BGN/PCGN romanization system for Burmese
Myanmar Language SIG
Myanmar Word Segmentation using Syllable level Longest Matching
Myanmar-English dictionary
Burmese fonts guide 2017. Using Burmese fonts on a computer.

Fonts supporting Burmese characters
Burmese Wikipedia:Font page
Burmese Unicode & NLP Research Centre
Parabaik Myanmar Unicode Project GPLed and OFLed
Ayar Myanmar online dictionary and download
Download KaNaungConverter_Window_Build200508.zip from the Kanaung project page and Unzip Ka Naung Converter Engine
http://unicode-table.com/en/sections/myanmar/
Padauk - Free Burmese Unicode font distributed by SIL International
U.N.O.B. USA has separate download links for Zawgyi font for Windows, MAC-Apple, and iPhone/iPad.

Font сonverters
A Guide to Using Myanmar Unicode: Convert from old Myanmar fonts to Unicode
Zawgyi Unicode Converter | Myanmar Tools - Open Source Zawgyi-One & Standard Myanmar Unicode Converter

Brahmic scripts
Scripts with ISO 15924 four-letter codes
Writing systems without word boundaries
Alphabet